Roger Hverven (born 15 March 1944) is a retired Norwegian handball ving-player who competed in the 1972 Summer Olympics.

He was born in Oslo and represented the club Oppsal IF. In 1972 he was part of the Norwegian team which finished ninth in the Olympic tournament. He played four matches and scored seven goals.

References

1944 births
Living people
Norwegian male handball players
Olympic handball players of Norway
Handball players at the 1972 Summer Olympics
Handball players from Oslo